Solmaz Sharif (born 1983) is an Iranian-American poet. Her debut poetry collection, Look, was a finalist for the 2016 National Book Award. She is currently an Assistant Professor of English at UC Berkeley.

Early life and education 
Sharif was born in Istanbul, Turkey as her parents were in the process of immigrating from Iran to the United States; her parents had studied in the US during the 1970s but had returned to Iran during the Iranian Revolution. Newborn Sharif and her family settled first in Texas, where her father finished his studies; the family moved again a few years later to Birmingham, Alabama, where her mother finished her bachelor's degree. After her mother graduated the family finally settled in Los Angeles, California, when Sharif was 11 years old. While living in Los Angeles, Sharif was exposed to the largest Iranian population outside of Iran itself, but was ostracized by her Iranian peers upon her arrival because of her family's struggle assimilating.

At sixteen years old, Sharif attended an Iranian Feminist Conference, facilitated by Angela Davis. Here, she discovered the phrase and label "women of color", from which Davis referred to the audience of women before her. This label was a punctum moment for Sharif, as this is the phrase that she had been searching for to identify with, and to embrace.

Wherever she went, she felt out of place. She never felt as though she was included or acknowledged by those around her. This feeling of exile is one of the bigger influences of her "exilic intellectual" prose- looking at something from the outside and to "question and interrogate" works of art or literature.

Sharif received her BA degree from the University of California, Berkeley, and her MFA degree from New York University.

Career 
She is currently an Assistant Professor of English at Arizona State University. In 2011, Sharif was awarded the "Discovery"/Boston Review Poetry Prize. Sharif received a fellowship from the National Endowment for the Arts in 2013. She has also received fellowships from the Fine Arts Work Center, Stanford University, and the Poetry Foundation. Sharif won the Theodore H. Holmes '51 and Bernice Holmes National Poetry Prize. She received a scholarship from the Bread Loaf Writers' Conference. Her book Look was a finalist for the 2016 National Book Award for Poetry, a finalist for the 2017 PEN Open Book Award, one of The New York Times Book Review's 100 Notable Books of 2016, a Publishers Weekly Best Book of 2016, a Washington Post Best Poetry Collection of 2016, one of The New Yorker's Books We Loved in 2016, and one of the San Francisco Chronicle's 100 Recommended Books of 2016. Look, Sharif's first book, "asks us to see the ongoing costs of war as the unbearable losses of human lives and also the insidious abuses against our everyday speech." Look draws on the U.S. Department of Defense Dictionary of Military and Associated Terms, and challenges readers to confront the war's effects on language.

Influences 
Some early influences include poems by Walt Whitman, which her mother would read to her as bedtime stories. While studying at UC Berkeley, she was part of the People for Poetry program and studied June Jordan's works. More current influences include Audre Lorde's essay, "Uses of Erotics: Erotics as Power," Hannah Weiner's Code Poems, Muriel Rukeyser's The Book of the Dead, Martha Collins’ Blue Front, and M. Nourbese Philip's Zong! She also cited June Jordan as an influence.

Critical response 
Look was reviewed favorably by The Los Angeles Review as an account of war's effects on culture and language.
‘’Customs: Poems’’, her second collection, considers the contingent status of immigrant women in the US; the book has received positive criticism by Kamran Javadizadeh in The New York Review of Books.

Bibliography

Poetry collections 
 Look: Poems. Graywolf Press, 2016. 
  Customs: Poems. Graywolf Press, 2022.

Essay

Publications 
Print Publications
 "My Father's Shoes" in A World Between
 "Your Style" in Spaces Between Us
 "Suitcases" in The Forbidden
 Three poems in jubilat
 Two poems in Gulf Coast
 "Break-up" in Black Warrior Review
 "Personal Effects" in Kenyon Review
Online Publications
 "Drone" at Witness
 "Special Events for Homeland Security" and "dear intelligence journal" at Sink Review
 "Suitcases" and "Theater" at PBS's Tehran Bureau
 "Reaching Guantanamo" at Paper Bag
 "lay" at DIAGRAM
 "Safe House" at Boston Review
 "Look" at PEN America
 "Perception Management: An Abridged List of Operations" at The New Republic
 "Vulnerability Study" at Poetry Magazine
 "Desired Appreciation" at Kenyon Review
 "Exile Elegy" at Lit Hub
 "Civilization Spurns the Leopard" and "Force Visibility" at Granta
 "Social Skills Training" at Buzzfeed Reader
 "Patronage" at The Yale Review

Awards 
 From 2012 to 2014 she was awarded the Stegner Fellowship from Stanford University.
 She won the 2014 Ruth Lilly and Dorothy Sargent Rosenberg Poetry Fellowship.
 She won the 2014 Rona Jaffe Foundation Writers' Award.
 She is the former managing director at the Asian American Writers' Workshop.
 She won the 2017 PEN Center Literary Award for Poetry.
 She won the 2017 American Book Award for Look.

References

External links 
 http://www.theparisreview.org/blog/2016/07/27/the-role-of-the-poet-an-interview-with-solmaz-sharif/
 https://www.poets.org/poetsorg/text/eileen-myles-and-solmaz-sharif-conversation-across-generations
 http://www.kenyonreview.org/conversation/solmaz-sharif/

20th-century American poets
20th-century Iranian poets
21st-century American poets
21st-century Iranian poets
American women poets
Iranian women poets
Living people
Writers from Istanbul
20th-century American women writers
21st-century American women writers
American people of Iranian descent
American Book Award winners
1983 births
20th-century Iranian women writers
21st-century Iranian women writers
Arizona State University faculty